Sergei Ivanovich Bulygin (born 10 July 1963) is a former Soviet biathlete.  During his career he won an Olympic gold medal as part of the Soviet Union 4 × 7.5 km relay team in the 1984 Winter Olympics in Sarajevo and 4 gold medals and a silver at the World Championships.

Biathlon results
All results are sourced from the International Biathlon Union.

Olympic Games
1 medal (1 gold)

World Championships
9 medals (5 gold, 3 silver, 1 bronze)

*During Olympic seasons competitions are only held for those events not included in the Olympic program.
**Team was added as an event in 1989.

Individual victories
1 victory (1 In)

*Results are from UIPMB and IBU races which include the Biathlon World Cup, Biathlon World Championships and the Winter Olympic Games.

References

External links
 
 Первый парень из деревни (Russian language) Interview with Sergei Ivanovich Bulygin, Sovetskaya Belorussiya – Belarus' Segodnya, 7 February 2006.

1963 births
Living people
Soviet male biathletes
Biathletes at the 1984 Winter Olympics
Olympic biathletes of the Soviet Union
Medalists at the 1984 Winter Olympics
Olympic medalists in biathlon
Olympic gold medalists for the Soviet Union
Biathlon World Championships medalists